Petre Gavrilă is a Romanian football manager who last worked as the head coach of defunct Turkish club Vanspor.

Career
Gavrilă started his managerial career with Chimia Râmnicu Vâlcea. After that, he coached Accra Hearts of Oak S.C., the Ghana national football team, and Sportul Studențesc București. In 1995, he was appointed head coach of Vanspor in the Turkish Süper Lig, a position he held until 1996.

References

External links
 Petre Gavrilă, former Ghana coach: "If I put defenders on them, they would cry!" 
 The breeding of African footballers under the Caraiman Cross
 Petre Gavrilă: "Ghana will defeat Uruguay and go to the semifinals!" 
 Petre Gavrila wants to revitalize sports in Busteni 
 Professor Gavrilă and his football school

Year of birth missing (living people)
Living people
Romanian football managers
FC Progresul București managers
Accra Hearts of Oak S.C. managers
Ghana national football team managers
FC Sportul Studențesc București managers
Romanian expatriate football managers
Expatriate football managers in Ghana
Romanian expatriate sportspeople in Ghana
Expatriate football managers in Turkey
Romanian expatriate sportspeople in Turkey